Pillgwenlly, usually known as Pill, is a community (civil parish) and coterminous electoral district (ward) in the city of Newport, South Wales.

Etymology 
The name is an elision of "Pîl Gwynllyw" (or "Gwynllyw's Pîl" in English). 'Pîl' is a localised topographical element (found across the coast of South Wales, from Pembrokeshire and into Somerset) indicating a tidal inlet from the sea, suitable as a harbour. In local tradition, it is said that this name derives from the early part of Gwynllyw's life when he was an active pirate. The tradition states that Gwynllyw maintained his ships at Pillgwenlly. Gwynllyw's reputation amongst sailors saw him adopted as the patron saint of choice for Welsh pirates and smugglers including Sir Henry Morgan.

Description 
The community is bounded by the River Usk to the east and southeast, the Ebbw River to the southwest, the Great Western Main Line to the west and Cardiff Road to the north.

It is an inner-city district to the south of the city centre and the built-up area is commonly shortened to "Pill". It contains the Newport Docks and the western ends of the Newport Transporter Bridge, City Bridge and George Street Bridge.

Pill hosts the annual Pill Carnival, on the last weekend of August. The Old Town Dock area is currently undergoing a huge mixed-use regeneration to bring the derelict dock lands back into use. A lively market takes place on a Saturday morning at the Newport Auctions site.

In 2012 the TV drama series Being Human featured internal and external cafe scenes filmed in Fanny's Cafe Pill near the Transporter Bridge.

Governance
The area is governed by the Newport City Council. Pillgwenlly is the name of an electoral ward to the city council, represented by two city councillors since 1995. The ward has consistently elected Labour Party councillors.

Sporting traditions 

Pill Harriers RFC is a successful rugby union team affiliated to the Welsh Rugby Union, whose membership was historically made up from the local dock workers. In its past it supplied many players to both Newport RFC and the Wales national rugby union team. The football manager Tony Pulis was born in Pill. The Pearce brothers, six of whom were professional boxers, hailed from Pill, including David 'Bomber' Pearce, Walter 'Bimbo' Pearce and Gary Pearce. Newport County A.F.C. manager Mike Flynn grew up in Pill, on Baldwin Street.

Health
In 2016 women in the Pillgwenlly ward had the fifth lowest life expectancy at birth, 74.4 years, of any ward in England and Wales.

Plan for designated area for prostitution
In July 2015, Gwent Police proposed a plan to develop a designated area for prostitution within the boundaries of Pill. The proposal follows a similar pilot scheme in the north of England, and a police spokeswoman said enforcement alone was "not an effective solution". Officers stated that no decision would be made until they had looked at evidence from other initiatives and consulted with residents, businesses and the council. Officers commented that similar schemes had increased the reporting of offences against prostitutes, and allowed other agencies to work with women to help them leave the sex industry. Monmouth MP David Davies, who has debated prostitution on the Council of Europe, was cautious about the proposed area, and said that it "should not become like Amsterdam."

References

Communities in Newport, Wales
Wards of Newport, Wales
Red-light districts in Wales